The Introduction of Marcus Cooper is the debut studio album by American recording artist and former Pretty Ricky vocalist Pleasure P; it was released on June 9, 2009, by Swagga Entertainment, Bluestar Entertainment and Atlantic Records. The title refers to the singer's birth name.

The album peaked at number 10 on the US Billboard 200 and number 2 on Top R&B/Hip-Hop Albums charts, selling 39,000 copies in its first week. As of January 2011, the album has sold over 150,000 copies nationwide. The album was nominated for Best Contemporary R&B Album in the 52nd annual Grammy Awards, and the song "Under" was nominated for Best Male R&B Vocal Performance and Best R&B Song.

Track listing

Chart positions

References 

2009 debut albums
Pleasure P albums
Albums produced by Rico Love
Atlantic Records albums